The nominations for the 15th Vancouver Film Critics Circle Awards, honoring the best in filmmaking in 2014, were announced on December 22, 2014. The winners were announced on January 5, 2015.

Winners and nominees

International

Best Film
 Boyhood
 Birdman or (The Unexpected Virtue of Ignorance)
 Whiplash

Best Director
 Alejandro G. Iñárritu – Birdman or (The Unexpected Virtue of Ignorance)
 Wes Anderson – The Grand Budapest Hotel
 Richard Linklater – Boyhood

Best Actor
 Jake Gyllenhaal – Nightcrawler
 Benedict Cumberbatch – The Imitation Game
 Michael Keaton – Birdman or (The Unexpected Virtue of Ignorance)

Best Actress
 Tilda Swinton – Only Lovers Left Alive
 Marion Cotillard – The Immigrant
 Reese Witherspoon – Wild

Best Supporting Actor
 J. K. Simmons – Whiplash
 Edward Norton – Birdman or (The Unexpected Virtue of Ignorance)
 Mark Ruffalo – Foxcatcher

Best Supporting Actress
 Patricia Arquette – Boyhood
 Jessica Chastain – A Most Violent Year
 Laura Dern – Wild

Best Screenplay
 Wes Anderson – The Grand Budapest Hotel
 Alejandro G. Iñárritu, Nicolás Giacobone, Alexander Dinelaris Jr., and Armando Bo – Birdman or (The Unexpected Virtue of Ignorance)
 Richard Linklater – Boyhood

Best Foreign Language Film
 Force Majeure
 Ida
 We Are the Best!

Best Documentary
 The Overnighters
 Citizenfour
 Virunga

Canadian

Best Canadian Film
 You're Sleeping Nicole (Tu dors Nicole)
 Enemy
 Mommy

Best Director of a Canadian Film
 Denis Villeneuve – Enemy
 Xavier Dolan – Mommy
 Stéphane Lafleur – You're Sleeping Nicole (Tu dors Nicole)

Best Actor in a Canadian Film
 Antoine Olivier Pilon – Mommy
 Jake Gyllenhaal – Enemy
 Maxwell McCabe-Lokos – The Husband

Best Actress in a Canadian Film
 Julianne Côté – You're Sleeping Nicole (Tu dors Nicole)
 Anne Dorval – Mommy
 Dagny Backer Johnsen – Violent

Best Supporting Actor in a Canadian Film
 Marc-André Grondin – You're Sleeping Nicole (Tu dors Nicole)
 Bruce Greenwood – Elephant Song
 Callum Keith Rennie – Sitting on the Edge of Marlene

Best Supporting Actress in a Canadian Film
 Suzanne Clément – Mommy
 Sarah Allen – The Husband
 Sarah Gadon – Enemy

Best Screenplay for a Canadian Film
 Xavier Dolan – Mommy
 Andrew Huculiak, Josh Huculiak, Cayne McKenzie, and Joseph Schweers – Violent
 Elan Mastai – The F Word

Best Canadian Documentary
 The Price We Pay
 Everything Will Be
 Just Eat It: A Food Waste Story

Best First Film by a Canadian Director
 Violent
 Sitting on the Edge of Marlene
 The Valley Below

Best British Columbia Film
 Violent
 Everything Will Be
 Preggoland

References

2014
2014 film awards
2014 in Canadian cinema
2014 in British Columbia